Francesco Perrone (3 December 1930 – 27 April 2020) was an Italian long-distance runner. He competed in the marathon at the 1960 Summer Olympics. Perrone was an athlete of the Gruppo Sportivo Fiamme Oro. Perrone died from COVID-19 during the pandemic in Italy on 27 April 2020 at the age of 89.

References

External links
 

1930 births
2020 deaths
Sportspeople from the Province of Brindisi
Athletes (track and field) at the 1960 Summer Olympics
Italian male cross country runners
Italian male long-distance runners
Italian male marathon runners
Olympic athletes of Italy
Athletics competitors of Fiamme Oro
Deaths from the COVID-19 pandemic in Apulia